Bawaka Mabele (born 9 June 1988) is a Congolese football defender who plays for JS Kinshasa.

References

1988 births
Living people
Democratic Republic of the Congo footballers
Democratic Republic of the Congo international footballers
TP Mazembe players
AS Vita Club players
Association football defenders
Linafoot players
21st-century Democratic Republic of the Congo people
2009 African Nations Championship players
Democratic Republic of the Congo A' international footballers
2011 African Nations Championship players